Heminomistis is a monotypic snout moth genus in the family Pyralidae. Its only species, Heminomistis melanthes, is known from Thailand. Both the genus and species were first described by Edward Meyrick in 1933.

References

Epipaschiinae
Monotypic moth genera
Moths of Asia
Pyralidae genera